The Hillman Center for Performing Arts is a multi-stage performing arts venue on the campus of Shady Side Academy's Senior School in Fox Chapel, a northern suburb of Pittsburgh, Pennsylvania. Featuring dedicated music and vocal practice spaces, the Richard E. Rauh proscenium theater, and the Peter J. Kountz black box theater, the Hillman Center serves as Shady Side Academy's primary performing arts classroom.

Facilities 

The Hillman Center for Performing Arts includes the 641-seat Richard E. Rauh Theater with a full orchestra lift, as well as the Peter J. Kountz Theater, a black box performance venue of 120 seats. Both spaces were designed by John Sergio Fisher & Associates. The Wean Room, an executive conference room that seats 40, the Mary Hillman Jennings Plaza, plus vocal and instrumental practice spaces, the Dr. Larry J. Papincak Memorial Recording Studio and a full scene shop.

History 
On Thursday, September 30, 2004, Shady Side Academy opened the Hillman Center for Performing Arts with its inaugural performance in the Richard E. Rauh Theater.

Hillman Performing Arts Series and Guest Performances
Following the official opening of the Hillman Center for Performing Arts in September 2004, Shady Side Academy named faculty member David Liebmann to serve as executive director. He established the Hillman Center's public programming, beginning the first season of its professional, public Performing Arts Series on Friday, October 6, 2006, with the performance given by the Golden Dragon Acrobats from Hebei, China. Subsequent performances during the 2006-2007 season featured Pittsburgh's River City Brass Band and the Pittsburgh Ballet Theatre.

The 2007–2008 season included The Boys of the Lough, a Grammy-nominated Celtic band, San Jose Taiko, Ira Ross & Friends, Samite of Uganda, Flamenco Sepharad, and Pittsburgh Ballet Theatre. Giant Eagle became the first major corporate sponsor. The Henry L. Hillman Foundation and the Weiner Family Foundation provided additional support.

As word of the venue spread, the Center expanded to offer its facilities to support community production partnerships. Such guests included:  Pittsburgh Concert Chorale, River City Youth Brass Band, Chatham Baroque with the Pittsburgh Opera Center, Nandanik Indian Dance Troupe, Hill Dance Academy Theatre, Pittsburgh Youth Pops Orchestra, Pittsburgh Youth Chamber Orchestra, Pittsburgh Chamber Music Society, Filipino American Association of Pittsburgh, Balmoral School of Piping and Drumming, and Candace Otto MacDonald.

Shady Side Academy Student Performances In The Hillman Center for Performing Arts 
The Shady Side Academy Gargoyle Society, under the direction of Dana Hardy-Bingham, produces a variety of theatrical productions each year, including a fall play, a winter musical, and a student-directed/student-written original play series in the spring. The winter musical is an inter-departmental effort with Dr. Dan Brill serving as Music Director.

Recent fall play and spring musicals include:
Into the Woods, Spring 2015
The Misanthrope (student adaptation), Fall 2014
Grease, Spring 2014
An Enemy of the People (student adaptation), Fall 2013
West Side Story, Spring 2013
A Midsummer Night's Dream (student adaptation), Fall 2012
The Music Man, Spring 2012
Romeo and Juliet (student adaptation), Fall 2011
Kiss Me, Kate, Spring 2011
On the Verge, Fall 2010
Guys and Dolls, Spring 2010
The Importance of Being Earnest, Fall 2009
Barnum, Spring 2009
One Flew Over the Cuckoo's Nest, Fall 2008
Fiddler on the Roof, Spring 2008
Brush Up Your Shakespeare (student production), Fall 2007
Footloose, Spring 2007
Amadeus, Fall 2006
South Pacific, Spring 2006
Pygmalion, Fall 2005
Oliver, Spring 2005
A Midsummer Night's Dream, Fall 2004

The Concert Choir, Chamber Choir, and String Ensemble, under the direction of Dan Brill, and the Symphonic Band and Jazz Ensemble, under the direction of Stanley Nevola, perform one concert each at the Hillman Center each trimester, featuring varied styles of vocal and instrumental performance.

Additionally, Shady Side Academy's Middle and Junior Schools use the Hillman Center for Performing Arts for performances, productions, and special events.

Music venues in Pittsburgh
Performing arts centers in Pennsylvania